Katherine Warren (July 12, 1905 – July 17, 1965) was an American film and television actress. She is best known for her roles in the 1949 film All the King's Men, the 1951 film The Prowler, and the 1954 film The Caine Mutiny.

Career
Prior to her career in films and TV, she was a stage actress on and off Broadway, in Summer Stock, and many theatrical venues throughout the US.  Her signature role was as Roxanne in Cyrano de Bergerac opposite Walter Hampden in the title role.  She married Vernon (aka Clark) Tharp Chesney in 1938.  The couple had a son, David, in 1947.  In 1948, due to her husband's illness, the family moved from New York City to Los Angeles where she began her movie and TV career.  Clark Chesney died on January 4, 1951, at the City of Hope in Duarte, California.

She appeared under her maiden name (Katharine Warren, which she spelled as shown here) in over 30 films and dozens of television programs including the TV series Alfred Hitchcock Presents (three episodes, 1956–1957) and Bonanza (1961) and the films Jailhouse Rock (1957), The Glenn Miller Story (1954), All the King's Men (1949), and as the mother of Ensign Willie Keith in the big-budget war drama The Caine Mutiny (1954).

She also coached aspiring young talent for Universal City Studios (then Universal International) in the early to mid-60s, and taught drama to young people at Brown Gables Conservatory in Brentwood, California.

Her final television performances came on the western series Laramie between 1960 and 1963.

Filmography

Broadway
 Three Times the Hour (1931) as Mrs. Lawrence M. Blake
 Wednesday's Child (1934) as Kathryn Phillips
 Blind Alley (1935) as Doris Shelby
 Cyrano de Bergerac (1936) as Roxane

References

External links
 

1905 births
1965 deaths
American film actresses
American television actresses
20th-century American actresses